Bournemouth is a former United Kingdom Parliamentary constituency. The seat was created in 1918 and existed until it was abolished and split into two new seats in 1950. During the constituency's existence it was the most south-westerly seat in Hampshire (although the county boundary between Dorset and Hampshire was redrawn in 1974 so the town was transferred to Dorset).

Boundaries
Before 1918 the County Borough of Bournemouth formed part of the then parliamentary borough of Christchurch. Under the Representation of the People Act 1918 Bournemouth gained its own constituency, with the same boundaries as the then county borough.

The seat was bordered to the west by the constituency of Dorset East, while to the north was New Forest and Christchurch. The rest of the constituency bordered the English Channel.

In the 1950 redistribution, the Representation of the People Act 1948 provided for the division of Bournemouth (with the addition of the neighbouring town of Christchurch) into Bournemouth East and Christchurch & Bournemouth West.

Members of Parliament

Elections

Elections in the 1910s

Elections in the 1920s

Elections in the 1930s

Elections in the 1940s

See also
List of former United Kingdom Parliament constituencies

References

 Boundaries of Parliamentary Constituencies 1885-1972, compiled and edited by F.W.S. Craig (Parliamentary Reference Publications 1972)
 British Parliamentary Election Results 1918-1949, compiled and edited by F.W.S. Craig (Macmillan Press, revised edition 1977)
 Who's Who of British Members of Parliament, Volume III 1919-1945, edited by M. Stenton and S. Lees (Harvester Press 1979)
 Who's Who of British Members of Parliament, Volume IV 1945-1979, edited by M. Stenton and S. Lees (Harvester Press 1981)

Parliamentary constituencies in South East England (historic)
Politics of Bournemouth
Constituencies of the Parliament of the United Kingdom established in 1918
Constituencies of the Parliament of the United Kingdom disestablished in 1950